Jodie Grinham (born 26 July 1993) is a British archer who represented Great Britain at the 2016 Summer Paralympics in Rio de Janeiro.

Personal life
Grinham was born with a short left arm and no fingers and half a thumb on her left hand. She was the first person with such a disability to attempt archery, so to avoid breaking the rule that the bow must not be attached to the archer, Grinham and her father Symon created a novel way of helping her grip her bow.

She is a student at BPP Law School in Waterloo, London.

Career
Grinham first started archery in 2008. She was first selected for the Great Britain archery team in 2014, and finished seventh at the World Para-archery Championships in Germany in 2015.

2016 Summer Paralympics
Grinham competed in the women's individual compound open and the team compound open events at the 2016 Summer Paralympics.

In the individual event, Grinham reached the quarter finals, losing to Somayeh Abbaspour of Iran.

In the team event, Grinham partnered John Stubbs. The pair finished the preliminary ranking round seeded 5th of 10 teams with a score of 1,324. After defeating Italy in the quarterfinals and South Korea in semi-finals, Grinham and Stubbs faced China in the gold medal match, but were bested by the Chinese duo of Zhou Jiamin and Ai Xinliang 151-143. This was however enough to earn Grinham a silver medal.

References

External links
 Profile on World Archery
 video of Grinham's quarter-final Women's individual compound open match with Somayeh Abbaspour of Iran

Living people
1993 births
British female archers
English female archers
Archers at the 2016 Summer Paralympics
Paralympic archers of Great Britain
People from Cardigan, Ceredigion
Sportspeople from Ceredigion
Medalists at the 2016 Summer Paralympics
Paralympic medalists in archery
Paralympic silver medalists for Great Britain